Philipstown may refer to:
 Philipstown, Northern Cape, South Africa
 Philipstown, New York, United States
A former name for Daingean, Ireland

See also
 Phillipstown
 Philipsburg Manor, spelled variously Philipse, Philipseborough, Philipsburgh, and Philipsbourg

Philipse